Zoltán Csizmadia (born 12 December 1977) is a Hungarian judoka.

Achievements

References

1977 births
Living people
Hungarian male judoka
21st-century Hungarian people